Coffee Brook is a tributary of Barnes Brook in Wyoming County and Sullivan County, in Pennsylvania, in the United States. The stream itself has a high gradient and primarily flows through forested lands. Access is difficult due to a lack of nearby roads and extensive private property signs in the area.

Course
Coffee Brook begins in Crane Swamp between Bartlett Mountain and Briskey Mountain in North Branch Township, Wyoming County. It flows north-northwest for a few tenths of a mile before meandering west for a short distance, crossing into Colley Township, Sullivan County. Here, the stream turns north-northwest for a few tenths of a mile, entering a valley, before turning north-northeast. A few tenths of a mile further downstream, it turns north and reaches its confluence with Barnes Brook.

Hydrology, geography and geology

It flows in a generally northerly direction.

Watershed and biology
The mouth of the stream is in the United States Geological Survey quadrangle of Jenningsville. However, its source is in the quadrangle of Dutch Mountain. It joins Barnes Brook near Lovelton.

The watershed of Coffee Brook is mostly forested. It is difficult to access the stream, as no part of it is within  of a road and the area is mostly on heavily posted private property. In 2000, the population density of the watershed was 4 people per square kilometer (10 per square mile).

The headwaters of Coffee Brook are in Crane Swamp, near the border of Pennsylvania State Game Lands Number 57. Spruce trees were common around the swamp in the late 19th century, though in the early 20th century, extensive logging was done in the area. More recently, several hundred specimens of a shrub species that is rare in Pennsylvania have been observed in the swamp.

History
Coffee Brook was entered into the Geographic Names Information System on August 2, 1979. Its identifier in the Geographic Names Information System is 1172127.

In 2001, Pennsylvania Fish and Boat Commission biologists attempted to visit Coffee Brook during a study of the North Branch Mehoopany Creek watershed, but were unable to find a way to reach the stream due to the extensive private property signs in the area.

See also
List of rivers of Pennsylvania

References

Tributaries of North Branch Mehoopany Creek